Md. Tajul Islam (born 30 June 1955) is a Bangladesh Awami League politician and the incumbent Member of Parliament from Comilla-9. In January 2019, he was appointed as the Minister of Local Government and Rural Development.

Early life
Islam was born on 30 June 1955 in Laksam, Comilla. He graduated from college with an MBA degree.

Career
Islam was elected to parliament in 1996. He was appointed a Member of the Standing Committee on Home Ministry in 2000. He was elected to parliament from Comilla-9 in 2008 and 2014 as a Bangladesh Awami League candidate. He served as the chairman of the Parliamentary standing committee on power and energy.

References

1955 births
Living people
People from Comilla District
Awami League politicians
Local Government, Rural Development and Co-operatives ministers
7th Jatiya Sangsad members
9th Jatiya Sangsad members
10th Jatiya Sangsad members
11th Jatiya Sangsad members